The 1989 Marshall Thundering Herd football team was an American football team that represented Marshall University as a member of the Southern Conference (SoCon) during the 1989 NCAA Division I-AA football season. Led by George Chaump in his fourth and final season as head coach, the Thundering Herd compiled an overall record of 6–5 record with a mark of 4–3 in conference play, tying for third place in the SoCon. The played home games at Fairfield Stadium in Huntington, West Virginia.

After the season concluded, George Chaump left Marshall to become the head coach at Navy.

Schedule

References

Marshall
Marshall Thundering Herd football seasons
Marshall Thundering Herd football